Socio-cognitive or sociocognitive has been used in academic literature with three different meanings: 1) it can indicate a branch of science, engineering or technology, such as socio-cognitive research, or socio-cognitive interactions, 2) it can refer to the integration of the cognitive and social properties of systems, processes, functions, as well as models, or 3) it can describe how processes of group formation effect cognition, studied in cognitive sociology. 

This term is especially used when complex cognitive and social properties are reciprocally connected and essential for a given problem.

Socio-cognitive engineering 

Socio-cognitive research is human factor and socio-organizational factor based, and assumes an integrated knowledge engineering, environment and business  modeling perspective, therefore it is not social cognition which rather is a branch of psychology focused on how people process social information.

Socio-cognitive engineering (SCE) includes a set of theoretical interdisciplinary frameworks, methodologies, methods and software tools for the design of human centred technologies, as well as, for the improvement of large complex human-technology systems.

Both above approaches are applicable for the identification and design of a computer-based semi-/proto-Intelligent Decision Support Systems (IDSS), for the operators and managers of large socially critical systems, for high-risk tasks, such as different types of emergency and disaster management, where human errors and socio-cognitive organization vulnerability can be the cause of serious losses.

Integration of cognitive social properties of systems

Group formation effect cognition

See also
 Cognitive science
 Cognitive sociology
 Memetics
 Situated cognition
 Socio-cognitive complexity in complex systems
 Socio-cognitive systems in systemics – they can be intelligence-based systems including humans, their culture, technologies and the environment.
 Sociology
 Systemics

References

External links
Towards a cognitive memetics (2001), Cristiano Castelfranchi - Web pages.
The socio-cognitive model of trust (2004–06) - Web pages of the Institute of Cognitive Sciences and Technologies (ISTC).
Human Factors in Nuclear Power Plant Safety Management: A Socio-Cognitive Modeling Approach using TOGA Meta-Theory.  (2011) International Congress on Advances in Nuclear Power Plants.

Cognitive science
Systems theory

socjo-kognitywistyka